Sombra is a fictional character in the Overwatch universe, a 2016 video game developed by Blizzard Entertainment. In the game's narrative, she is an exceptional black bag operation hacker from Mexico that had joined Talon, a criminal organization aligned against Overwatch. In game, Sombra  has stealth-based abilities to move around the battlefield, and is able to hack any opposing character to briefly prevent them from using their special abilities.

Sombra was the second new character to be added to Overwatch after launch, and was introduced formally during the November 2016 BlizzCon event. However, she had been designed and tested internally well before the game's launch, and Blizzard had established an alternate reality game that began within Overwatchs open beta in 2016 that teased her character. Though Blizzard considered the alternate reality game to have drawn interest in Sombra, they found the prolonged campaign taxed players' attention, and subsequently have limited new character promotions to only a few weeks ahead of their formal announcements.

Development and release 
The concept of Sombra had been one of the original characters in Overwatchs cast, but as they developed the game, they found her skill kit did not fit in with the other heroes they had at that time. She started off as a hero character with a hacking ability as to keep opponents debuffed, according to lead character designer Geoff Goodman. Goodman noted that they found in gameplay testing that hacking-only skills were not "super great" and started to consider building the character around stealth, incorporating the hacking aspect as part of the character's abilities. They had previously tried a stealth character with Genji, having had given him an ability to invisibly move behind enemies, stun them, and then kill their foes with another skill, but found this only useful to deal with opponents that were separated from their team members, making the stealth aspect not fun to play. Using this past criticism, they gave similar stealth abilities to Sombra, but in combination with the hacking skills as to be a more effective contribution to the team regardless of their opponents' style. Goodman noted that they were initially hesitant about incorporating skill debuffs into the game, knowing that players would likely react negatively to having skills stripped even for a short period of time. However, they were emboldened by the successful playtesting of Ana and her sleep-inducing ability which they were able to tweak quickly in response to feedback, and believed they would be able to manage Sombra's hacking skills in the same manner.

In terms of Overwatch's characters, they wanted to bring more villain-like characters to the game, according to Goodman. Goodman considers Sombra to be "evil in the sense that she's kind of only out for herself", but will stay loyal to her employer, Talon, as well as the situation continues to work out for her and further her own agendas. Blizzard had planned a long-term alternate reality game (ARG) for Sombra as early as the open beta period for Overwatch. According to Goodman, who had planned out the initial stages of the ARG, the goal was to have players "get an idea of who she is and a little bit of her personality before we even unveiled her", and playing off her nature as a hacking character.

Casting for Sombra was done prior to her launch. Carolina Ravassa was part of one of those casting calls. Though Blizzard was looking for Mexican actors specifically with a Mexico City accent, Ravassa, who is originally from Colombia, had developed a northern Mexican accent, and used it during the casting call, gaining the role. Voice casting director Andrea Toyia then worked with Ravassa to tune the accent to where they wanted it. Sombra's dialog was written by Chu with help from members of Blizzard's localization team in Mexico to include local references.

As planned from its start, the ARG concluded during BlizzCon on November 4, 2016, with the official reveal of Sombra. She was introduced through an animated short played during the convention's opening ceremony, and she was made available for play by attendees on the show floor. It was announced that she would be introduced to the game's public testing region on PC in the following week. Sombra was released for all users on November 15, 2016.

Leaked images 
On October 7, a Reddit user posted an image of an Xbox Games Store listing for Halloween-themed loot boxes, an in-game reward item obtainable via microtransaction, that contained a reference to Sombra. On October 8, an image allegedly of an internal Blizzard developer website was posted to DeviantArt, Imgur, and Gyazo. The image claimed to show a character model of Sombra, a partial biography of the character, and a description of a Halloween-themed gameplay mode involving Junkrat as Dr. Junkenstein. A simultaneous leak included an Overwatch Halloween comic featuring Dr. Junkenstein. The Halloween event, including a game mode featuring Dr. Junkenstein as described in the leak, went live on October 11. On November 1, a Blizzard store listing was accidentally released and immediately removed. The image featured a character resembling the leaked character model, named Sombra in its filename, and bore the signature of a Blizzard concept artist.

Gameplay 
Sombra is classified under the "Damage" role in Overwatch. She is equipped with a low-damage, high-capacity machine pistol for short-range combat. Her abilities allow her to hack enemies and their turrets, which prevents them from using their special or ultimate abilities or picking up health packs, though they may still use primary skills. Sombra's hacks also relay information about the opponent's health and ultimate ability status to her teammates, as long as they are within line-of-sight of the opponent, for about a minute from the hack. Her hacks can also be applied to health packs, allowing them to recharge at three times their normal speed, while also disabling their use for enemies. While her hacks on enemies are short, lasting six seconds, her hacks on health packs can last for a minute, unless hacked again before this minute runs out. Sombra may also put down a "translocator" to teleport, and can turn invisible for an infinite amount of time and gain a burst of speed to hide behind enemy lines to perform her hacks. Her ultimate ability is an EMP blast that deals 10k damage to all enemy barriers and shields, along with hacking enemies in the process.

Lore 
Sombra's biography is provided through additional Overwatch media including the Overwatch digital comics. Her real name is Olivia Colomar, revealed in the "Searching" online comic. She was born within the fictional city of Dorado, Mexico, the same year that the Overwatch organization was established, and is a native speaker of Spanish. While young, she lost everything from the Omnic Crisis, and became an orphan. She recognized her talents in hacking and the value of information, and later joined the fictional Los Muertos gang in Dorado. Eventually, she was recruited by Talon, an antagonist organization that includes Reaper and Widowmaker. As a hacker, she employed the name Sombra, Spanish for "shadow", and eschewed her birth name.

Alternate reality game 

During Overwatch open beta period, clues about Sombra were placed into the game's Dorado map. Hints about Ana Amari, a later released support sniper hero, were also placed into the Temple of Anubis map at the same time, and players assumed the hints were meant for Sombra. Speculation that Sombra is Ana persisted until Ana's release as a playable character in July 2016.

YouTube videos and sky code 
Blizzard uploaded a video to YouTube detailing Ana Amari's origins. The video contained a Spanish message encoded in a sequence of hex values. On July 19, a developer update video about Ana was posted to YouTube and contained unusual static. In four hours, players ran the static through seven forms of decryption to discover a QR code leading to a Spanish voice message suggesting future puzzles will be more difficult.

On August 2, a video detailing the game's Summer Games event contained a code in Base64 cipher that decrypted into a salted hash requiring a key for further decryption. Players also discovered clues in the video arranging nine playable heroes into cardinal and ordinal directions. Where previous puzzles were solved in hours, players struggled to make progress for days.

On August 4, a comment from developer Jeffrey Kaplan prompted players to search the sky of the Dorado map. A pattern, called sky code and later found to be a visual artifact, was found and eventually rendered into a musical piece. However, on August 8, a datamoshed image of Dorado found in Blizzard's Overwatch screenshot gallery contained a message in Spanish urging to look elsewhere. Players were led to a cipher in the games' achievements, which was decrypted using the directional clue from the Summer Games video; the clue ultimately led to another datamoshed image containing another Spanish message and an ASCII art sugar skull. The song created from the sky code was later incorporating into the game during an emote animation for Sombra.

A Moment in Crime, LumériCo, and Volskaya Industries websites 
On August 24, a user "Skycoder", referencing the sky code, posted to the Battle.net forum in Spanish in a thread that changed into a glitched image of Reaper and a sequence of characters. Players discovered that the thread was a countdown. The sequence was converted into a skull, which ultimately revealed a message: momentincrime. This message was linked to a previously Overwatch video bearing an email address for A Moment in Crime tips line. Emails sent to the address received a reply directly mentioning Sombra.

The counter reached 100% on October 18, 2016, eight weeks after the counter was discovered. The website updated to display a message stating that Sombra hacked Bastion, a playable Omnic character; a message hidden in the website's HTML suggesting an upcoming version number of Overwatch. A day later, Overwatch updated to a build number matching the clue. In the new build, Bastion beeps near screens on the Dorado map displaying a reference to Sombra. The beeps were translated into morse code, which pointed players to a website for the fictional LumériCo company based in Dorado. Ultimately, players decoded a message from Sombra urging them to help her expose corruption within LumériCo and eventually were instructed to wait for further instructions.

On November 1, users' profile images on the Overwatch subreddit were changed to Sombra's skull logo, to give the appearance that Sombra "hacked" the website, and an announcement asked users to assist Sombra in infiltrating the Lumérico website. The corresponding Discord server was similarly changed to give the appearance of a hack by Sombra. The volume of initial traffic crashed the LumériCo website and the Discord channel. Clues ultimately directed users to a website for the fictional Volskaya Industries based in Russia.

Sombra was officially revealed at BlizzCon 2016, with the debut of Infiltration, an animated short featuring her, Reaper and Widowmaker infiltrating Volskaya Industries to assassinate Katya Volskaya. After Reaper and Widowmaker are separated from her, Sombra chases Katya down and pretends to kill her, until she reveals her true intention of "making a friend", or in reality, blackmailing Katya with evidence she collaborated with omnics, Russia's enemies in the Overwatch universe.

Response 
Paul Tassi of Forbes said of the game, "While the meat and bones of the ARG was solid — the codes, the hashes and the hunt itself — the problem has been the rewards of the game." Luke Lancaster of CNET felt that the ARG's "slow drip feed on information fits in very nicely with Overwatch's understated storytelling" that is often told through related media and short in-game dialogue exchanges.

Michael McWhertor of Kotaku reported that players expected the countdown on A Moment in Crime to culminate in Sombra's reveal, and when a vague clue was given upon its completion, threads on the Blizzard forums and Overwatch subreddit were immediately created "expressing fatigue and annoyance" and urged Blizzard not to repeat the experience. David Lumb of Engadget similarly reported players as "dismayed" at the new set of clues and wrote: "Unsurprisingly, many fans threw up their hands and abandoned the chase." Lumb additionally noted that despite the effort invested in decrypting clues, little was learned about Sombra. Goodman noted that though they considered the ARG a success, they did receive user feedback that describes putting too much effort for little reward in the ARG, and plan to use this input as feedback for any future efforts. One aspect Goodman realized they did wrong was put too much of the ARG dependent on fixed countdown times, during which players had quickly solved the various puzzles well before the countdown was completed, making the various phases of the ARG feel overly-drawn out as they waited for the countdown timers to complete. In response to the negative feedback of the Sombra ARG, Blizzard's Jeff Kaplan said that future hero reveals will be more direct and they will not likely use the ARG approach.

In August 2016, players, using social engineering tactics, gained access to a Battle.net account containing "Sombra" in its account name and attempted to gain access to four similar accounts. Players also discovered an email address associated with a World of Warcraft account in an Overwatch comic, and they emailed and allegedly attempted to access the account; Kaplan clarified that the accounts held no relation to the ARG. Fears that fans would attempt to access the Blizzard employee network led Reddit moderators to remove images of the leaked Sombra character model in October 2016.

References

External links 
 Official character profile
 Infiltration animated short on YouTube
 "Sombra Origin Story" on YouTube

Female characters in animated films
Female characters in comics
Female characters in video games
Fictional gang members
Fictional hackers
Fictional Mexican people in video games
Fictional technopaths
Hackers in video games
Orphan characters in video games
Overwatch characters
Video game characters introduced in 2016
Video game characters who can teleport
Video game characters who can turn invisible